The Swiftsure class was a group of two British pre-dreadnought battleships. Originally ordered by Chile as the Constitución class during a period of high tension with Argentina, they were intended to defeat a pair of armoured cruisers ordered by the latter country and were optimized for this role. This meant that they were smaller and more lightly armed than most battleships of the time. They were purchased by the United Kingdom in 1903 prior to their completion to prevent their purchase by the Russian Empire as tensions were rising between them and the Japanese Empire, a British ally. Completed the following year,  and  had roughly similar careers for the first decade of their service careers. They were initially assigned to the Home Fleet and Channel Fleets before being transferred to the Mediterranean Fleet in 1909. Both ships rejoined Home Fleet in 1912 and were transferred abroad in 1913, Swiftsure to the East Indies Station as its flagship, and Triumph to the China Station.

After the beginning of World War I in August 1914, Swiftsure escorted troop convoys in the Indian Ocean until she was transferred to the Suez Canal Patrol in December. After defending the Canal in early 1915 from Ottoman attacks, the ship was then transferred to the Dardanelles in February and saw action in the Dardanelles Campaign bombarding Ottoman fortifications. Triumph participated in the hunt for the German East Asia Squadron of Maximilian Graf von Spee and in the campaign against the German colony at Tsingtao, China. The ship was transferred to the Mediterranean in early 1915 to participate in the Dardanelles Campaign. She was torpedoed and sunk off Gaba Tepe by the German submarine  on 25 May 1915.

Swiftsure was assigned to convoy escort duties in the Atlantic from early 1916 until she was paid off in April 1917 to provide crews for anti-submarine vessels. In mid-1918, the ship was disarmed and stripped in order to be used as a blockship during a proposed second raid on Ostend. Swiftsure was sold for scrap in 1920.

Design and description

Background

Sir Edward Reed, chief designer for Armstrong Whitworth, was in Chile for health reasons at the time, and met with Chilean Navy officials to discuss the idea of purchasing or building two battleships with high speed and a powerful armament on a low displacement. Purchase of existing ships was not a practical option, so the Chileans asked Reed to design the ships for construction in the United Kingdom. Chile ordered the ships, to be named Constitución and Libertad, in 1901, Constitución from Armstrong Whitworth at Elswick and Libertad from Vickers at Barrow-in-Furness.

The ships were considered second-class battleships, lightly constructed, armed, and armoured by British standards; Swiftsure, in fact, suffered from structural weakness while in service and required hull strengthening, although Triumph did not have such problems. Chile had required the ships to fit into the graving dock at Talcahuano, so they had to be longer and narrower for their displacement than ships built to British standards. Details in mast and anchor arrangements as well as the arrangement of magazines and shell-handling rooms also were different from British standards.

As part of the Pacts of May, which ended the near-war tensions between Argentina and Chile, Argentina sold its two armored cruisers, Rivadavia and Moreno, that were under construction in Italy to Japan. Constitución and Libertad were put up for sale in early 1903. While the United Kingdom was not entirely interested in the ships, international politics took precedence: when the Russian Empire made an offer for the ships, the British grew concerned that they could be used against their new ally Japan. To prevent this, the British purchased both Chilean battleships on 3 December 1903 for £2,432,000.

Their purchase by the Admiralty was organised by the London firm of Antony Gibbs & Sons, a partnership run by Alban Gibbs and his younger brother Vicary Gibbs. Both were Members of Parliament (MPs), and their role in the transaction meant that they were disqualified from the House of Commons, under an old law which debarred MPs from accepting contracts from the Crown. This triggered two by-elections, in which Alban was re-elected unopposed, but Vicary lost his seat.

Although they were designed to Chilean rather than British requirements and required some modifications during construction after their purchase, no major changes were needed to the design to render them suitable for British service.

General characteristics
The ships were some  overweight compared to their designed displacement which increased their draught and reduced their freeboard.

In 1914, the crew numbered 803 officers and ratings. The Swiftsures were quite manoeuvrable as a result of their balanced rudder and a hull form optimized to make the rudder more effective. They were the last British battleships to enter service with bow crests and were also were the last to enter service equipped with ventilation cowls.

Propulsion
The ships were powered by two four-cylinder inverted vertical triple-expansion steam engines, each driving a single propeller. The engines proved to be more powerful than anticipated and both ships exceeded  during sea trials. This made them the fastest battleships in the Royal Navy at the time of their completion, although their sustained speed in service was slightly slower than that of the older .

Armament
Neither ship's armament was of a standard Royal Navy type—they had been designed to meet the requirements of the Chilean Navy and each ship was armed by its respective builder, although performance was identical. They were the first British battleships since Renown of 1895 to mount a main battery of 10-inch (254 mm) guns and the last to do so. The ships mounted slightly different types of 45-calibre 10-inch guns, each ship using guns designed by its builder. They followed the standard British practice of the time of mounting the main battery in two twin turrets, one forward and one aft. The Royal Navy believed that the 10-inch guns were too light to be effective against modern battleships; they could penetrate the armour of the latest German and Russian battleships, but not that of the better-armoured French battleships. The firing cycle of the Mk VI guns used on Swiftsure was claimed to be 15 seconds while that of the Mk VII guns on Triumph was 20–25 seconds. Each gun was provided with 90 shells per gun.

They had a powerful secondary battery, being the only British battleships to mount 50-calibre 7.5-inch guns; these were of a different type than the 7.5-inch guns mounted on later British cruisers. Ten of the guns were mounted in a central battery on the main deck, where they were criticized for taking up too much deck space; the other four were in casemates abreast the fore- and mainmasts on the upper deck. The two types of guns differed slightly in construction, but had identical performance. The ships carried 150 rounds per gun.

Defence against torpedo boats was provided by fourteen QF (quick-firing) 14-pounder Mk I or Mk II guns firing  shells, but the guns were modified to use the standard  shell used by the QF 12 pounder 18 cwt gun in British service. Their maximum range and rate of fire is unknown. 200 rounds per gun were carried by each ship.

The ships were also equipped with a pair of  submerged torpedo tubes, one on each broadside. They were provided with nine torpedoes.

Armour
The Swiftsures armour scheme was roughly comparable to that of the Duncan class. Fore and aft of the  oblique bulkheads that connected the belt armour to the barbettes, the belt continued, but was reduced in thickness. It was six inches thick abreast the barbettes, but was reduced to two inches fore and aft of the barbettes. It continued forward to the bow and supported the ship's spur-type ram. It continued aft to the steering gear compartment and terminated in a  transverse bulkhead. The upper strake of 7-inch armour covered the ship's side between the rear of the barbettes up to the level of the upper deck. The upper deck casemates were also protected by 7-inch faces and sides, but were enclosed by rear 3-inch plates. The 7.5-inch guns on the main deck were separated by  screens with  plating protecting the funnel uptakes to their rear. A longitudinal 1-inch bulkhead divided the battery down its centreline.

Below this level they thinned to three and two inches respectively. The deck armour inside the central citadel ranged from 1 to 1.5 inches in thickness. Outside the citadel, the lower deck was three inches thick and sloped to meet the lower side of the belt armour. Naval historian R. A. Burt assessed the greatest weakness of their armour scheme as the reduction in the thickness of the barbette armour below the upper deck. He believed that this made the ships' magazines vulnerable to oblique hits near the barbettes.

Ships

Service history

Swiftsure
Swiftsure was commissioned on 21 June 1904 for service in the Home Fleet and the Channel Fleet until 1908. She collided with Triumph 3 June 1905 and suffered damage to her propellers, sternwalk and aft hull. The ship was refitted at Chatham Dockyard in June–July 1906. Swiftsure was briefly placed in reserve from 7 October 1908 to 6 April 1909 when she was recommissioned for service with the Mediterranean Fleet. The ship was reassigned to Home Fleet on 8 May 1912 until she was given a lengthy refit from September 1912 to March 1913. Swiftsure was recommissioned on 26 March and assigned as the flagship of the East Indies Station.

During World War I, the ship escorted Indian troops from Bombay to Aden from September–November 1914. She was then transferred to the Suez Canal Patrol on 1 December to help defend the Canal. From 27 January to 4 February 1915, the ship helped to defend the Canal during the First Suez Offensive by Ottoman forces. Swiftsure was then transferred to the Dardanelles on 28 February and saw action in the Dardanelles Campaign bombarding Ottoman fortifications. She was assigned to the 9th Cruiser Squadron for escort duties in the Atlantic in February 1916. On 11 April 1917, the ship arrived at Chatham where she was paid off and placed in reserve to provide crews for anti-submarine vessels. Swiftsure was refitted in mid-1917 and was used as an accommodation ship from February 1918. Later that year, the ship was disarmed and stripped in order to be used as a blockship during a proposed second raid on Ostend. The war ended, however, before this was carried out and she was briefly used as a target ship before she was listed for sale in March 1920. Swiftsure was sold for scrap on 18 June 1920 to the Stanlee Shipbreaking Company.

Triumph
Much like Swiftsure, Triumph was commissioned on 21 June 1904 and was initially assigned to the Home Fleet, later the Channel Fleet, until 1909. The following year, she accidentally struck her sister ship and sustained damage to her bow. Triumph received a brief refit at Chatham Dockyard in October 1908 and was transferred to the Mediterranean Fleet on 26 April 1909. The ship returned to the Home Fleet in May 1912. She was transferred to the China Station on 28 August 1913 and was placed in reserve at Hong Kong until mobilized in August 1914 at the beginning of World War I.

Triumph participated in the hunt for the German East Asia Squadron and in the campaign against the German colony at Tsingtao, China until November when she began a refit at Hong Kong. The ship departed on 12 January 1915 to participate in the Dardanelles Campaign. She was torpedoed and sunk off Gaba Tepe by the German submarine U-21 while bombarding Ottoman fortifications in the Dardanelles on 25 May 1915.

Notes

Footnotes

References

External links

The Dreadnought Project

Battleship classes
Ship classes of the Royal Navy
 
World War I battleships of the United Kingdom